Irina Nikolayevna Timofeyeva (born 5 April 1970) is a Russian long-distance runner who specializes in running the marathon.

She won the Singapore Marathon in 2005 and the Paris Marathon in 2006. She ran for Russia at the 2008 Summer Olympics, placing seventh in the marathon race. She won the Nagano Olympic Commemorative Marathon in 2009.

She was banned from the sport for two years, starting 6 September 2016, due to abnormalities in her biological passport.

International competitions

Professional marathons

See also
List of doping cases in athletics

References

External links 
 
marathoninfo

1970 births
Living people
Russian female long-distance runners
Russian female marathon runners
Olympic female marathon runners
Olympic athletes of Russia
Athletes (track and field) at the 2008 Summer Olympics
World Athletics Championships athletes for Russia
Russian Athletics Championships winners
Paris Marathon female winners
Doping cases in athletics
Russian sportspeople in doping cases